Healthpoint is a hospital located in Abu Dhabi, UAE. Healthpoint was founded in 2013, and specialises in three fields: Orthopedic and Sports Medicine, Bariatric & Metabolic Surgery  and Dentistry.
Healthpoint is a public hospital and part of Mubadala’s Healthcare Network.

Location
Healthpoint is located at Zayed Sports City in Abu Dhabi, UAE.

Affiliation
Healthpoint is a partner of US Children's National Medical Center and received the Gold Seal of Approval from the Joint Commission International (JCI). Healthpoint is also the official regional partner of Manchester City Football Club.

Departments
 Anesthesia
 Bariatric & Metabolic Surgery
 Cardiology
 Dentistry
 Dermatology
 Diagnostic Imaging
 Digestive Diseases
 Ear, Nose and Throat
 Family Medicine
 General Practice
 General Surgery
 Gynecology
 Internal Medicine
 Non-invasive Cosmetics
 Orthopedics & Sports Medicine
 Pain Management
 Pediatrics
 Physiotherapy & Rehabilitation
 Plastic & Cosmetic Surgery
 Podiatry
 Respiratory & Sleep Medicine
 Rheumatology
 Spine Care
 Urology & Endourology
 Vascular Surgery
 Wound Care

Leadership
As of 2022, Omar Al Naqbi is the Acting Executive Director of Healthpoint with Dr. Mai Al Jaber acting as the Medical Director of the hospital.

References

Hospitals in the United Arab Emirates
2013 establishments in the United Arab Emirates
Hospitals established in 2013